The Moosomin First Nation ( môsominihk) is a Cree First Nation band government in Cochin, Saskatchewan, Canada. Its reserves are approximately thirty-five kilometres and twenty-two kilometres north of North Battleford. It borders the rural municipalities of Meota No. 468 and Round Hill No. 467.

The First nation is named after Cree Chief ᒨᓱᒥᐣ môsomin. The name literally means "mooseberry or high bush cranberry".

History 
Chief Moosomin signed Treaty 6 at Battleford in 1880. Moosomin is the Cree word for the moose berry or high bush cranberry.

Indian reserves
The band governs thirteen Indian reserves:
Moosomin Indian Reserve No. 112A, 259.80 ha.
Moosomin Indian Reserve No. 112B, 32 km north of Battleford, 6871.10 ha.
Moosomin Indian Reserve No. 112E, 129.50 ha.
Moosomin Indian Reserve No. 112F, 582 ha.
Moosomin Indian Reserve No. 112G, 37 km west of Spiritwood, 5077.90 ha.
Moosomin Indian Reserve No. 112H, 37 km west of Spiritwood, 2042.90 ha.
Moosomin Indian Reserve No. 112J, 23 km southwest of Spiritwood, 199 ha.
Moosomin Indian Reserve No. 112K, 129.50 ha.
Moosomin Indian Reserve No. 112L, 27 km northwest of Blaine Lake, 2069.20 ha.
Moosomin Indian Reserve No. 112M, 707.70 ha.
Moosomin Indian Reserve No. 112N, 64.80 ha.
Moosomin Indian Reserve No. 112P, 29 km north of Hafford, 709 ha.
Moosomin Indian Reserve No. 112S, 126.60 ha.

References

First Nations governments in Saskatchewan
Cree governments